Horizons of Rock Developing Everywhere or H.O.R.D.E. Festival was a touring summer rock music festival originated by the musical group Blues Traveler in 1992. In addition to travelling headliners, the festival gave exposure to bands, charities, and organizations from the local area of the concert.

History
The H.O.R.D.E. Festival began in 1992 as a solution to the dilemma of five East Coast bands that sought to avoid the club circuit in the summertime when other larger bands were playing to sold out amphitheaters. John Popper, the singer for Blues Traveler, explained this in a Guitar World interview: "In the summer, we'd all go out and draw maybe one or two thousand people. And there are no places outdoors that small, so we'd have to play indoors, which sucked. Then a couple of us got together and wondered 'What if we all went on tour? If we each drew our usual two thousand people, we might draw enough to fill a big shed (amphitheater). So from the outside, it may have looked like there was this big movement happening, but really, it was just a bunch of bands thinking about how to survive."

Inspired by the previous summer's success of Perry Farrell's Lollapalooza Festival (which had been organized by Bill Graham Presents, the driving force behind Blues Traveler's record and promotional deal), John Popper and Dave Frey called upon their compatriots Widespread Panic, The Samples, the Spin Doctors, the Aquarium Rescue Unit and Phish to join them in a nationwide, summer, amphitheater tour.  After originally christening the traveling spectacle "Horizons of Rock Developing East Coast", the vision spread to "Everywhere", and so the name was created. It is rumored that John Popper came up with the idea of the H.O.R.D.E. tour at the Arrowhead Ranch, a Deadhead-managed dude ranch in Parksville, New York that Phish, Blues Traveler, Spin Doctors, Widespread Panic and Aquarium Rescue Unit among others all played at in 1991.

The H.O.R.D.E. tour can be viewed as the beginnings of the second incarnation of jam band music, as well as the improvisation, community of fans, and diversity of music that became trademarks of the genre. The initial incarnation of jam music, led and epitomized by bands like the Grateful Dead and the Allman Brothers Band, sparked a love for improvisational rock and jazz that was fostered by both the musicians and fans associated with the second wave of 'jam' music. The H.O.R.D.E. tour, featuring such new jam icons as the Spin Doctors, Phish, Widespread Panic, the Aquarium Rescue Unit (and subsequent Col. Bruce Hampton projects), including the Dave Matthews Band, allowed for a new generation of experimental improvisational music to hit a national audience. The festival was able to bring together a group of musicians with a similar approach to live performance, and thus consolidate fans of the music; hence, a scene was created around the developing genre.

After seven successful years, the final H.O.R.D.E. Tour concert took place on September 5, 1998 at Portland Meadows in Portland, Oregon.

Artists
The following artists participated in the H.O.R.D.E. festival:

311
Agents of Good Roots
Alana Davis
Allgood
The Allman Brothers Band
Aquarium Rescue Unit
Barenaked Ladies
Beck
Bela Fleck and the Flecktones
Ben Folds Five
Ben Harper and the Innocent Criminals
Big Head Todd and The Monsters
The Black Crowes
Blues Traveler
Bran Van 3000
Cake Like
Chief Broom
Chris Stills
Chrysalids
Cowboy Mouth
Cycomotogoat
Dan Dyer with Breedlove
Dave Matthews Band
David Garza
 Dear Liza
The Decadent Royals
Dionne Farris
Emmet Swimming
Elderberry Jam
Fastball
Fathead
Foodstamp
The Freddy Jones Band
Galactic
G. Love & Special Sauce
God Street Wine
Gov't Mule
The Hatters
Joan Osborne
King Crimson
Kula Shaker
Leftover Salmon
Lenny Kravitz
Marcy Playground
Medeski, Martin & Wood
The Mighty Mighty Bosstones
Morphine
 mR rEALITY
Natalie Merchant
Neil Young and Crazy Horse
Patoombah Whitebread Rhythm Ensemble
Paula Cole
Pete Droge and the Sinners
Phish
Primus
Ricki Lee Jones
Robert Bradley's Blackwater Surprise
Rudy 
Rusted Root
Screamin' Cheetah Wheelies
Sheryl Crow
Sister 7
Sky Cries Mary
Smashing Pumpkins
Son Volt
Soul Coughing
Soulhat
Spin Doctors
Spiritualized
Squirrel Nut Zippers
Super 8
Taj Mahal & The Phantom Blues Band
The Authority
Twenty Nineteen
The Samples
The Thundercloud Singers
The Tragically Hip
Toad The Wet Sprocket
Ugly Americans
Ween
Widespread Panic
Wilco
Ziggy Marley and the Melody Makers

The Mother Hips

Return
There were rumors over the years that the band would eventually revive the H.O.R.D.E. tour. Asked about this in 2006, Blues Traveler drummer Brendan Hill replied, "The future is always bright for us, and we are constantly thinking about the future, maybe two or three years in advance." The H.O.R.D.E. Festival was officially revived on July 9, 2015, featuring Blues Traveler,  311, The Verve Pipe and Big Head Todd and the Monsters. The inaugural performance was held at the DTE Energy Music Theatre in Clarkston, Michigan.

Notes

External links
H.O.R.D.E. Information @ bluestraveler.net
Review of Chicago '97 show
H.O.R.D.E. Widens Rock's Horizons

Music festivals in the United States
Concert tours
Jam bands
Music festivals established in 1992